Earl of Dumbarton is a title of Scottish nobility, referring to Dumbarton in the area West Dunbartonshire, Scotland. The title has been created twice, once in the Peerage of Scotland in 1675 and once in the Peerage of the United Kingdom in 2018.

History
The title was first created in the Peerage of Scotland on 9 March 1675 for Lord George Douglas, son of the Marquess of Douglas and younger brother of the Earl of Selkirk, for services fighting in the Franco-Dutch War. Lord Dumbarton was also created Lord Douglas of Ettrick. He was married to Anne Douglas (née Wheatley), the first Countess of Dumbarton, who was the sister of Catherine Fitzroy, Duchess of Northumberland. Following the death of their only son, the unmarried second Earl, both titles became extinct on 7 January 1749.

On 16 July 2018, the title was recreated in the Peerage of the United Kingdom by Queen Elizabeth II as one of the two subsidiary titles for her grandson Prince Harry, Duke of Sussex, on the occasion of his wedding, when he was also created Baron Kilkeel. The title was announced on 19 May 2018. The heir to the earldom is his son, Prince Archie of Sussex.

Earls of Dumbarton, first creation, 1675

| George Douglas1675—1692
| 
| 1635Douglas Castleson of William Douglas, 1st Marquess of Douglas, and Lady Mary Gordon
| Anne Wheatley (died 1691)1 child
| 1692 St-Germain-en-Laye, Paris, France aged  years
|-
| George Douglas1692—1749
| 
| 1687son of George Douglas, 1st Earl of Dumbarton, and Anne Wheatley (died 1691)
| Unmarried
| 1749 Douai, France aged  years
|-
|}

Earl of Dumbarton, second creation, 2018

| Prince HarryHouse of Windsor2018–presentalso: Duke of Sussex and Baron Kilkeel (2018)
| 
| 15 September 1984St Mary's Hospital, Londonson of Charles, Prince of Wales, and Lady Diana Spencer
| Rachel Meghan Markle19 May 20182 children
|  now  old
|-
|}

Line of succession

 Prince Harry, Earl of Dumbarton (b. 1984) 
 (1) Prince Archie of Sussex (b. 2019)

References

 
Extinct earldoms in the Peerage of Scotland
 
Earldoms in the Peerage of the United Kingdom
Noble titles created in 1675
Noble titles created in 2018
Prince Harry, Duke of Sussex